Twin Sugars is a summit in West Virginia, in the United States.

Twin Sugars most likely was named for the fact two sugar maple trees stood there.

References

Mountains of Greenbrier County, West Virginia
Mountains of West Virginia